Transportation in Malaysia started to develop during British colonial rule, and the country's transport network is now diverse and developed. Malaysia's road network is extensive, covering 290,099.38 kilometres, including 2,016.05 km of expressways (in 2021). The main highway of the country extends over 800 km, reaching the Thai border from Singapore. Peninsular Malaysia has an extensive road network, whilst the road system in East Malaysia is not as well-developed. The main modes of transport in Peninsular Malaysia include buses, trains, cars and to an extent, commercial travel on airplanes.

Malaysia has six international airports. The official airline of Malaysia is Malaysia Airlines, providing international and domestic air service alongside two other carriers. Most of the major cities are connected by air routes. The railway system is state-run, and covers a total of 1,849 km. Popular within the cities are commuter rail and rapid transit, which reduces the traffic load on other systems, and is considered safe, comfortable and reliable.

Land

Roads 

The Second longest highway is East-Coast Highway (LPT-E8) Spanning almost 500 km from Kuala Lumpur to state capital of Terengganu, Kuala Terengganu. The road systems in Sabah and Sarawak are less developed and of lower quality in comparison to that of Peninsular Malaysia. Recently, the construction of Pan-Borneo Highway is approved under 2015 Malaysian Budget. The highway project spans 1,663 km (936 km in Sarawak, 727 km in Sabah) mostly mirror the existing trunk road, and it involves the widening of the present three-metre-wide single-carriageway into a dual-carriageway. Driving on the left has been compulsory since the introduction of motor vehicles in Federated Malay States in 1903 during British colonial era. It is estimated that 9,432,023 passenger cars is actively using this road network in 2018.

The maintenance of the road in Malaysia however is very poor. Potholes can be seen everywhere even though big budget have been allocated for the maintenance of the road. In addition, street lamps has also been poorly maintained, if you drive from KLIA to the northern part of the country. You can have a first person experience on the workmanship of JKR. This poor road maintenance has statistically contributed to a lot of accidents in the country. Off road vehicles are really popular in West Malaysia due to the poor condition to the road that has been dubbed by the local as being similar to the "surface of the moon".

Railways 

Most of the railway lines are consisted of ballasted setup, along with concrete sleepers, which serves better in wet and humid tropical condition, compared to wooden sleepers which can rot over time. As early as 1980s, due to the need for local suppliers of such products, a few local Malaysian rail manufacturing companies had been formed by collaboration with foreign technology partners.

 of it is metre gauge, while  is standard gauge. Seven hundred and sixty-seven kilometres of metre gauge tracks and all of the standard gauge tracks are electrified. Intra-city travel is through relatively inexpensive rapid transit systems. Commuter rail and electric train service are available for most major only Kuala Lumpur and its neighbouring states, development of such efficient transportation have not been made in other states that really needs them  . Malaysia already approved her first Kuala Lumpur–Singapore High Speed Rail project spanning 375 km between Kuala Lumpur and Singapore. This rapid development had spurred growth of local Malaysian rail service Companies which caters these niche needs.

Air

Airports 
Malaysia has 62 airports, of which 38 are paved. The national airline is Malaysia Airlines, providing international and domestic air services. Major international routes and domestic routes crossing between West Malaysia and East Malaysia are served by Malaysia Airlines, AirAsia and Malindo Air while smaller domestic routes are supplemented by smaller airlines like MASwings, Firefly and Berjaya Air. Major cargo airlines include MASkargo and Transmile Air Services.

Kuala Lumpur International Airport is the main and busiest airport in Malaysia. In 2018, it was the world's 12th-busiest airport by international passenger traffic, recording over 43.5 million international passenger traffic. Other major airports include Kota Kinabalu International Airport, which is also Malaysia's second-busiest airport and busiest airport in East Malaysia with over 8.6 million passengers in 2018, and Penang International Airport, which serves Malaysia's second-largest urban area, with over 7.99 million passengers in 2018.

Airports with paved runways 
total: 38 
over 3,047 m: 5 
2,438 to 3,047 m: 7 
1,524 to 2,437 m: 10 
914 to 1,523 m: 9 
under 914 m: 7 (2004 est.)

Heliports 
2 (2006 est.)

Airlines
National airline:
 Malaysia Airlines

Other airline:
 List of airlines of Malaysia

Waterways 
Malaysia has  of waterways, most of them rivers.

Ports and harbours 

Malaysia is strategically located on the Strait of Malacca, one of the most important shipping lanes in the world. Malaysia has two ports that are listed in the top 20 busiest ports in the world, Port Klang and Port of Tanjung Pelepas, which are, respectively, the second- and third-busiest ports in Southeast Asia after the Port of Singapore. Port Klang is Malaysia's busiest port, and the thirteenth-busiest port in the world in 2013, handling over 10.3 million TEUs. Port of Tanjung Pelepas is Malaysia's second-busiest port, and the nineteenth-busiest port in the world in 2013, handling over 7.6 million TEUs.

This is a list of Malaysian ports and harbours:
 Bintulu
 Kota Kinabalu
 Kuantan
 Kemaman
 Kuching
 Kudat
 Labuan
 Lahad Datu
 Lumut
 Miri
 Pasir Gudang
 Penang
 Port Dickson
 Port Klang
 Sandakan
 Sibu
 Tanjung Berhala
 Tanjung Kidurong
 Tawau
 Tanjung Pelepas
 Kuala Kedah

Ferry 
 Rapid Ferry
 Langkawi Ferry Service
 Pangkor Ferry Service
 Tioman Ferry Service
 Labuan Ferry service
 Tawau Ferry service
 Miri Ferry service
 Sandakan Ferry service

Merchant Marine 
Total: 360 ships (1,000 GT or over) 5,389,397 GT/
by type: bulk 59, cargo 100, chemical tanker 38, container 66, liquefied gas 25, livestock carrier 1, passenger 2, petroleum tanker 56, roll on/roll off 5, vehicle carrier 8

Foreign-owned: China 1, Germany 2, Hong Kong 8, Indonesia 2, Japan 2, South Korea 1, Liberia 1, Monaco 1, Norway 1, Philippines 2, Singapore 81, Vietnam 1 
registered in other countries: 75 (2009 est.)

Pipelines 

See also 
 List of airports in Malaysia
 Kuala Lumpur–Singapore High Speed Rail
 Public transport in Kuala Lumpur
 Transportation in Kuala Lumpur
 Plug-in electric vehicles in Malaysia

Regulation:
 Road signs in Malaysia
 Puspakom, vehicle inspection
 Vehicle registration plates of Malaysia

References